Cartonema philydroides is a herb in the Commelinaceae family.

It blooms between October and December producing yellow flowers.

It is found among sand dunes and in winter-wet areas along the west coast in the Mid West, Wheatbelt, Peel and South West regions of Western Australia where it grows in sandy soils.

References

philydroides
Plants described in 1858
Taxa named by Ferdinand von Mueller